is a subway station on the  (operated by Tokyo Metro) and the  (operated by the Tokyo Metropolitan Bureau of Transportation). It is located in the Ningyocho neighborhood of Nihonbashi, Chūō, Tokyo, Japan.

Station layout 
On the Hibiya Line, Ningyocho Station has two platforms separated by two tracks. Track 1 is for passengers traveling toward  and Naka-meguro Stations. Track 2 serves those heading toward  and Kita-senju Stations.

On the Asakusa Line, Ningyocho Station has an island platform between the two tracks. Trains stopping at Track 4 go toward  and Oshiage Station.

Platforms

History 
Ningyocho Station opened on May 31, 1962, as a station on the Hibiya Line. The Asakusa Line (then known as Toei Line 1) station opened on September 30, 1962.

The station facilities of the Hibiya Line were inherited by Tokyo Metro after the privatization of the Teito Rapid Transit Authority (TRTA) in 2004.

Surrounding area
The station serves the Ningyocho neighborhood. Nearby are the headquarters of Nisshinbo Industries, and Nikkan Kogyo Shimbun.

References
This article incorporates material from the article 人形町駅 (Ningyocho Eki) in the Japanese Wikipedia, retrieved December 15, 2007.

Railway stations in Tokyo
Toei Asakusa Line
Tokyo Metro Hibiya Line
Stations of Tokyo Metro
Stations of Tokyo Metropolitan Bureau of Transportation
Railway stations in Japan opened in 1962
Nihonbashi, Tokyo